In Greek mythology, Epiales (Ancient Greek: Ἠπιάλης) was the spirit (daemon) and personification of nightmares. Alternate spellings of the name were Epialos (Ἠπίαλος), Epioles (Ἠπιόλης), Epialtes (Ἐπιάλτης) or Ephialtes (Ἐφιάλτης).

Family 
Epiales was probably numbered amongst the Oneiroi (Dream-Spirits) and thus one of the sons of the goddess Nyx (Night).

Mythology 
Epiales was also known as Melas Oneiros (Black Dream)."The words epialos, epiales and epioles denote (1) the feverish chill (2) the daimon who assaults sleepers. Homer and most writers have epioles with the e; the form in -os means something different, namely the feverish chill . . . Alkaios (Alcaeus) called it epialos. Apollonios says that Epialtes itself (the nighmare daimon) is called Epiales and by a change of a to o Epioles."

"[The goddess Gaia (Earth) is invoked to drive away a nightmare :] Like a spider, he [a rapist] is carrying me [a woman] seaward step by step--a nightmare (oneiros), a black nightmare (melas oneiros)! Oh! Oh! Mother Earth (Ma Ge), mother Earth (Ma Ge), avert his fearful cries! O father Zeus, son of Ge (Earth)!"

See also
Oneiroi
Phobetor

Notes

References 

 Aeschylus, translated in two volumes. 2. Suppliant Women by Herbert Weir Smyth, Ph. D. Cambridge, MA. Harvard University Press. 1926. Online version at the Perseus Digital Library. Greek text available from the same website.

Greek sleep deities
Greek gods
Personifications in Greek mythology
Dream
Fear
Nightmares in fiction
Daimons